John Akehurst is the name of:

 John Akehurst (British Army officer) (1930–2007), Deputy Supreme Allied Commander Europe
 John Akehurst (photographer), beauty and fashion photographer